Caroline Smith may refer to:

Sportspeople
Caroline Smith (diver) (1906–1994), American Olympic diver
Caroline Smith (badminton) in European Universities Badminton Championships
Caroline Smith (soccer) in 2009 W-League
Caroline Smith (triathlete) in 2008 Ironman 70.3 World Championship

Others
Caroline Estes Smith (1877–1970), manager of the Philharmonic Orchestra of Los Angeles
Carol Smith (radio presenter) (Caroline Jane Smith, born 1975), Singaporean radio presenter 
Caroline Smith and the Good Night Sleeps, American indie folk band
 Caroline Smith, set designer who won the 2009 Academy Award for Best Production Design
Caroline Smith (geologist), British scientist and Principal Curator of Meteorites at the Natural History Museum (UK)
 Caroline Smith (linguist), American linguist